Alex Matthew Doyle (born 17 February 2001) is an English footballer who plays as a midfielder for Colne on loan from Marine. He began his career with Salford City, where he made his debut in 2018, and was the club's first academy graduate to play in the English Football League. He is the older brother of Manchester City defender Callum Doyle.

Career
Doyle is a product of the Salford City academy. He made his English Football League debut on 14 September 2019. He was awarded a professional contract with the club in the summer of 2019 after being a member of Academy92 which included studying a two-year programme at Trafford College.

In September 2020 he joined Marine on loan. At the end of the 2020–21 season, it was announced that he would be leaving Salford City. In July 2021 he joined Marine. On 15 August, Doyle scored on his second Marine debut, the team's second in a 3–1 on the opening day of the season against Newcastle Town. He joined Colne on loan for a month in February 2023.

Career statistics

References

External links

2001 births
Living people
English footballers
Association football midfielders
Salford City F.C. players
Salford City F.C. academy graduates
Marine F.C. players
English Football League players
Northern Premier League players